VTAC may mean:

 Victorian Tertiary Admissions Centre
 Vietnam Tactical Tomahawk

See also
 Ventricular tachycardia, or V-tach, an irregular beating of the heart
 Two-stroke power valve system#Honda V-TACS, a foot-operated power valve system made by Honda
 VTEC, a variable valve timing system used in Honda engines